Fast Five: Original Motion Picture Soundtrack (released as Fast & Furious 5: Rio Heist (Original Motion Picture Soundtrack) outside the United States) is the soundtrack to Justin Lin's 2011 heist action film Fast Five. It was released through ABKCO Records on April 25, 2011 on iTunes with physical units available on May 3, 2011.

Track listing

The tracks featured as background music in the film are "OA" and "Slim" by Euphon, "Big City" by Doug Simpson and Don Omar's "Taboo".

Charts

Weekly charts

Year-end charts

References

External links

Fast & Furious albums
2011 soundtrack albums
Action film soundtracks
ABKCO Records soundtracks
Albums produced by Mr. Porter
Albums produced by Mario Caldato Jr.